Ghous Muhammad Khan Niazi is a Pakistani politician who has been a member of Senate of Pakistan, since March 2015.

Education
He holds a degree of Bachelor of Medicine and Bachelor of Surgery (M.B.B.S) which he received from the University of Punjab in 1986.

Political career
He was elected to the Senate of Pakistan as a candidate of Pakistan Muslim League (N) in 2015 Pakistani Senate election.

References

Living people
Pakistani senators (14th Parliament)
Pakistan Muslim League (N) politicians
University of the Punjab alumni
Year of birth missing (living people)